Gavin Lawless is a former South African rugby union player.

Playing as fullback, he set a number of point scoring records, including the most tries and most points in a Super 12 match (4 tries and 50 points, for the Sharks against the Highlanders in 1997), the most penalties in a Currie Cup season (48 for Transvaal in 1996), and the most penalties in a Currie Cup final (6, for Transvaal vs.  in 1996).

References

South African rugby union players
Rugby union fullbacks
Western Province (rugby union) players
Golden Lions players
Sharks (Currie Cup) players
Sharks (rugby union) players
Bulls (rugby union) players
Pumas (Currie Cup) players
Living people
1970 births